Novomonastyrskoye is a rural locality (a selo) in Novokokhanovsky Selsoviet, Kizlyarsky District, Republic of Dagestan, Russia. The population was 1,186 as of 2010. There are 9 streets.

Geography 
Novomonastyrskoye is located 13 km northwest of Kizlyar (the district's administrative centre) by road. Novokokhanovskoye and Novokrestyanovskoye are the nearest rural localities.

Nationalities 
Avars, Dargins, Russians and Kumyks live there.

References 

Rural localities in Kizlyarsky District